Sphenella orbicula is a species of tephritid or fruit flies in the genus Sphenella of the family Tephritidae.

Distribution
South Africa.

References

Tephritinae
Insects described in 1957
Diptera of Africa